Wolfenstein is a video game series.

Wolfenstein may also refer to:

 Castle Wolfenstein, the original 1981 game that the series is based off
 Wolfenstein 3D, a 1992 game in the series
 Return to Castle Wolfenstein, a 2001 game in the series
 Wolfenstein (2009 video game), a game in the series
 Wolfenstein: The New Order, a 2014 game in the series
 Wolfenstein (rock), a rock formation between Tirschenreuth and Hohenwald in Bavaria

People with the surname 
 Eugene Victor Wolfenstein (1940-2010), American social theorist and psychoanalyst
 Lincoln Wolfenstein (1923–2015), American physicist
 Martha Wolfenstein (1869–1906), American novelist

See also 
 Wolfstein (disambiguation)